Vlhošť is the highest mountain (614 m) in Kokořínsko area, Czech Republic.

It consists of sandstone and phonolite. The phonolite comes from tertiary volcanism while the sandstones are older. Rock terraces are visible.
A nature preserve, covering 81,99 ha of its summit and south-western rock cliff, was established in 1998.

Etymology 
The name Vlhošť is probably related to the Czech word vlhký meaning wet.

Location and surroundings 
The mountain lies 10 km south-west from the city of Česká Lípa. A small village of Hvězda, a part of Blíževedly municipality, is located just under the mountain. Other natural attractions nearby include Husa (a rock formation, a natural monument), the mountain of Ronov (a natural monument) with a castle ruin atop, Pod Hvězdou (a natural monument) and Stříbrný vrch (a natural monument).

Notes 
 Much of this article is based on the article in German Wikipedia

References 

Mountains and hills of the Czech Republic